The Bailiff of Jersey is the civic head of the Bailiwick of Jersey. In this role, he is not the head of government nor the head of state, but the chief justice of Jersey and presiding officer of Jersey's parliament, the States Assembly. The Bailiff is also the President of the Royal Court. It is similar in role to the Bailiff of Guernsey.

The position of Bailiff was created shortly after the Treaty of Paris 1259 in which the king of England, Henry III, gave up claim to all of the Duchy of Normandy but the Channel Islands. In 1290, separate bailiffs for Jersey and Guernsey were appointed.

History
The position of Bailiff in Norman law predates the separation of Normandy in 1204. When the Channel Islands were granted self-governance by King John after 1204, legislative power was vested in 12 jurats, the twelve "senior men" of the island. Along with the Bailiff, they would form the Royal Court, which determined all civil and criminal causes (except treason).

Any oppression by a bailiff or a warden was to be resolved locally or failing that, by appeal to the King who appointed commissioners to report on disputes. In the late 1270s, Jersey was given its own Bailiff (the first record of someone holding the position is in 1277) and from the 1290s, the duties of Bailiff and Warden were separated. The (Sub-)Warden became responsible for taxation and defence, while the Bailiff became responsible for justice. While probably originally a temporary arrangement by Otto de Grandison, this became permanent and the foundation for Jersey's modern separation of Crown and justice. It also lessened the Warden's authority relative to the Bailiff, who had much more interaction with the community.

In 1462, the occupying French Governor de Brézé issued ordinances outlining the role of the Bailiff and the Jurats. It may well be during this occupation that the island saw the establishment of the States. Comte Maulevrier, who had led the invasion of the island, ordered the holding of an Assize in the island. Maulevrier confirmed the place of existing institutions, however created the requirement for Jurats to be chosen by Bailiffs, Jurats, Rectors and Constables. The earliest extant Act of the States dates from 1524.

Peyton was also against democracy in the form of the States and the freedoms of the Courts in Jersey. In 1615, Jean Hérault was appointed Bailiff by the King, having been promised the role by Letters Patent in 1611. Peyton disputed this appointment, claiming it was the Governor's jurisdiction to appoint the Bailiff. Hérault asserted it was the King's jurisdiction to directly appoint the Bailiff. An Order in Council (dated 9 August 1615) sided with Hérault.

Hérault took this to claim the Bailiff was the real head of government and took steps to assert the precedence of the Bailiff over Governor: he ordered his name to be placed before the Governor's in church prayers and was the first Bailiff to wear red robes (in the style of English judges). To back his claims, he cited that in the Norman administrative tradition, the Bailiffs had "noone above them except the Duke". Though the Privy Council did not agree with Hérault's extreme position on the precedence of the Bailiff, on 18 February 1617 it declared that the "charge of military forces be wholly in the Governor, and the care of justice and civil affairs in the Bailiff." This secured for the Bailiff precedence over the Governor on justice and civil affairs.

By 1750, the Bailiffship had de facto become a hereditary position in the de Carteret family. Absences of the de Carterets and all other high-ranking posts left Charles Lempière, the Lieutenant Bailiff, in effective full control over the island. Lempière was a Parliamentarian, but by temperament was autocratic. His family had significant power with a number of high-ranking roles in the island and he issued ordinances and quashed protest through his court.:195

After the 1948 States reforms, Jurats were removed from the States, now only sitting on the Royal Court (and the Licensing Assembly). The reforms declared that the Bailiff shall be the judge of the law, and the Jurats the "judge of fact".

Appointment
The Bailiff is appointed by the Crown through Letters Patent after consultation with the Island. They serve at His Majesty's pleasure, usually until an age of retirement as specified in their Letters Patent, unless they resign earlier.

Roles
Ex-Bailiff Sir Philip Bailhache divides the role of Bailiff into four 'headings' –

 President of the Royal Court
 President of the States
 Ancillary functions deriving from the Presidency of the Royal Court
 Ancillary functions deriving from the Presidency of the States

The full list is expanded on in detail below, but the functions can be summarised as --

 Chief Justice and President of the Royal Court
 Speaker and President of the States Assembly
 Chief citizen of the island
 President of the Licensing Assembly
 Official conduit between the Government and UK Government
 Licensor of public entertainment
 Ceremonial functions: keeper of the Royal Mace, custodian of the island's seal

The Bailiff is the Chef Magistrat of the island and presides over the Royal Court and the Court of Appeal. They sit in court with at least two jurats. They are a judge of law but not generally a judge of fact. Instead, the jurats normally decide the facts in civil and the sentence in criminal cases. The Bailiff appoints - but alone cannot suspend or dismiss - the Judicial Greffier (the clerk of the court). The Bailiff can also issue search warrants.

In the States, the Bailiff is the President (Speaker) of the Assembly. This position has been in place from the origins of the States in the 16th century, particularly because the States began as a consulting body of the Royal Court and the Bailiff was the President of the Court. The Bailiff has a vote in the event the States is equally divided, but traditionally uses it to preserve the status quo. In the Chamber, the Bailiff's seat is  higher than the Lieutenant Governor's to emphasise the Bailiff's higher position in regard to the island's civil government. Through this presidency, the Bailiff is the island's chief citizen (hence the island is known as a Bailiwick). They are the official channel of communication between the island authorities and the UK Government, though this has altered since the development of ministerial government and the creation of the role of Chief Minister. The Bailiff is President of the Emergencies Council, which was established in 1990.

In addition to these two roles, the Bailiff presides the College of Electors, who appoint the Jurats, and he presides over the Licensing Assembly, the remains of a body which once exercised considerable administrative authority, but now only has the powers to grant alcohol licences. Furthermore, the Bailiff has powers over public entertainment. All public entertainment - such as music festivals or the Battle of Flowers - can only take place by permission of the Bailiff. This is done on consultation with public services and standards of public decency.

The Bailiff is also the keeper of the island's Royal Mace the custodian of the island's seal, first granted by Edward I in 1279.

Future
The dual role of the Bailiff as head of the judiciary and President of the States has been criticised. The 2000 Clothier report (into the Machinery of Government) argues against the dual role on the grounds that –

 No one should hold political power unless elected (the Bailiff is unelected) and the Speaker of a parliament cannot be non-political
 Consequently, the States cannot remove the Bailiff, as he is appointed by Letters Patent
 No one involved in making laws should be involved judicially in a dispute based upon them.
 The States President makes decisions about who should and should not be allowed to speak, but the Bailiff cannot then determine challenges to those decisions in the Royal Court.

Such calls for the separation of the office's powers are longstanding: in 1859, writer Helier Simon called a potential separation "desirable". The report therefore recommends that the Bailiff is removed as President of the States and that the States should elect their own Speaker.

The dual role has been defended on the grounds that the modern position of Bailiff is held in good temperament. Criticims do not account for the independence in action of successive Bailiffs and therefore the supposed conflict in the lack of separation of powers only exists in theory, and not in practice. Ex-Bailiff Sir Philip Bailhache argues that, if the States Presidency were removed from the jurisdiction of the Bailiff, the Bailiff could no longer be described as the island's chief citizen.

Holders
The list of bailiffs is only reliably traceable from Philippe L'Evesque's appointment in 1277, although earlier bailiffs are mentioned and the office may date from before 1204.

14th century 
 Jean de Carteret 1302
 Philippe Levesque 1309
 Colin ? Hasteyn 1315
 Henry de St. Martin 1318
 Guillaume Longynnour  1324
 Herny de St.Martin  1324
 Pierre Ugoun (Ygon)  1324
 Lucas de Espyard  1324
 Pierre de la Haye  1324
 Philippe de Vyncheleys  1324
 Nicolas (or Colin) Hasteyn  1332
 Philippe de Vincheleis  1332
 Matthieu Le Loreour  1332
 Pierre de la Haye  1332
 Guillaume Brasdefer  1332
 Guille Hastein (or Hastings) 1348
 Roger de Powderham 1351
 Guille Hastein (or Hastings) 1352
 John Cockerels 1356
 Raoul Lempriere 1362–1364
 Richard de St. Martin 1367–1368
 Richard le Petit 1368–1369
 Richard de St. Martin 1370
 Richard le Petit 1371
 Richard de St. Martin 1372–1374
 Thomas Brasdefer 1378–1391
 Giefrey Brasdefer 1396–1401

15th century 
 Colin le Petit 1402–1403
 Guillaume de Layc 1405–1406
 Thomas Danyel 1406–1425
 Jean Bernard 1432, 1436–1444
 Jean Lempriere 1434–1438
 Thomas de la Cour 1435
 Jean Payn 1444, 1446
 Regnauld de Carteret 1446–1451
 Jean Poingdestre 1452–1453
 Nicolas Morin 1459–1468
 Jean Poingdestre 1468–1477
 Guillaume Hareby 1479–1481, 1484–1485
 Clement Le Hardy 1486–1493
 Jean Nicolle 1494
 Thomas Lempriere 1495–1513, 1415?

16th century 
 Helier de Carteret 1513–1515
 Helier de Carteret 1516–1523
 Helier de Carteret 1529–1560
 Hostes Nicolle 1561–1564
 John Dumaresq 1566–1583
 George Paulett 1583–1586
 John Dumaresq 1586–1587
 George Paulett 1587–1591
 John Dumaresq 1591–1594
 George Paulett 1594–1614

17th century 
 Jean Herault 1614–1621
 William Parkhurst 1622–1624
 Jean Herault 1624–1626
 Philippe de Carteret 1627–1643
 Michel Lemprière 1643 
 Sir George de Carteret, 1st Bt., 1643–1651
 Michel Lemprière 1651–1660
 Sir George de Carteret, 1st Bt., 1660–1661
 Sir Philippe de Carteret, 1st Bt., 1661–1662
 Philippe de Carteret 1662–1665
 Edouard de Carteret 1665–1682
 Sir Philippe de Carteret, 2nd Bt., 1682–1693
 Edouard de Carteret 1694–1703

18th century 

 Sir Charles de Carteret, 3rd Bt., 1703–1715
 John Carteret, 2nd Earl Granville 1715–1763
 Robert Carteret, 3rd Earl Granville 1763–1776
 Henry Frederick, Lord Carteret 1776–1826

19th century 
 Thomas Le Breton 1826–1831
 Jean de Veulle 1831–1848
 Thomas Le Breton 1848–1857
 Jean Hammond 1858–1880
 Sir Robert Pipon Marett 1880–1884
 George Clement Bertram 1884–1898
 Edouard Charles Malet de Carteret 1898
 William Venables Vernon 1899–1931

20th century 

 Charles Malet de Carteret 1931–1935
 Sir Alexander Coutanche (created Lord Coutanche in 1961) 1935–1962
 Cecil Stanley Harrison 1961–1962
 Sir Robert Le Masurier 1962–1975
 Sir Frank Ereaut 1975–1985
 Sir Peter Crill 1986–1994
 Sir Philip Bailhache 1994–2009

21st century 
 Sir Michael Birt 2009–2015
 Sir William Bailhache 2015–2019
 Sir Timothy Le Cocq 2019–present

See also
 List of Lieutenant Governors of Jersey
 List of Bailiffs of Guernsey
 List of Seigneurs of Sark

References

External links

 
Jersey, Bailiffs of Jersey
Jersey, Bailiffs of Jersey
Bailiffs